Ygapema is a genus of beetles in the family Cerambycidae, containing the following species:

 Ygapema accentifer (Gounelle, 1910)
 Ygapema arixi (Martins & Galileo, 2005)
 Ygapema boliviana (Belon, 1899)
 Ygapema clavata (Chevrolat, 1862)
 Ygapema delicata (Gounelle, 1911)
 Ygapema errata (Martins & Galileo, 2008)
 Ygapema michelleae (Schmid, 2011)
 Ygapema mulleri (Fuchs, 1955)
 Ygapema plaumanni (Fuchs, 1966)

References

Clytini